In category theory, a strong monad over a monoidal category (C, ⊗, I) is a monad (T, η, μ) together with a natural transformation tA,B : A ⊗ TB → T(A ⊗ B), called (tensorial) strength, such that the diagrams
, and 
commute for every object A, B and C (see Definition 3.2 in ).

If the monoidal category (C, ⊗, I) is closed then a strong monad is the same thing as a C-enriched monad.

Commutative strong monads 

For every strong monad T on a symmetric monoidal category, a costrength natural transformation can be defined by
.
A strong monad T is said to be commutative when the diagram

One interesting fact about commutative strong monads is that they are "the same as" symmetric monoidal monads. More explicitly,
 a commutative strong monad  defines a symmetric monoidal monad  by

 and conversely a symmetric monoidal monad  defines a commutative strong monad  by

and the conversion between one and the other presentation is bijective.

References 

Adjoint functors
Monoidal categories